Remieg A. M. Aerts (born 17 September 1957) is a Dutch historian and Professor of Dutch History at University of Amsterdam.

Biography
Aerts was born in Amsterdam. After secondary school he briefly considered studying Chinese, but instead of that he started studying history. After he finished his PhD, for which he took ten years, in 1997 at the University of Groningen Aerts became assistant professor in Philosophy of History at that same university. Later he became professor of Political History at Radboud University Nijmegen. In 2000 he won the Dr. Wijnaendts Francken-prijs for his work De letterheren. Liberale cultuur in de negentiende eeuw: het tijdschrift De Gids. In 2003 Aerts was one of the starters of the Omstreden Democratie (Controversial Democracy) project of the Netherlands Organisation for Scientific Research, which involved dozens of scientists doing research on Dutch democracy.

He was elected member of the Royal Netherlands Academy of Arts and Sciences in 2011. In 2017 Aerts transferred from the Radboud Univsersity to the University of Amsterdam where he became professor of Dutch History. Three years later he received the "Nederlandse biografieprijs" (Dutch Biography Price) for his book Thorbecke wil het about the 19th century Dutch liberal statesman Johan Rudolph Thorbecke.

Selected bibliography
 Thorbecke wil het: Biografie van een staatsman. (4e ed.) Amsterdam: Prometheus, 2018.
 Alles is cultuur: Vensters op moderne cultuurgeschiedenis. (ed. with Klaas van Berkel and Babette Hellemans) Hilversum: Verloren, 2018.
 Omstreden democratie: over de problemen van een succesverhaal. (with Peter de Goede) Amsterdam: Boom, 2013.
 Land van kleine gebaren: Een politieke geschiedenis van Nederland 1780-1990. (with Herman de Liagre Böhl, Piet de Rooy and Henk te Velde) Amsterdam: Boom, 2013.
 De letterheren. Liberale cultuur in de negentiende eeuw: het tijdschrift De Gids Amsterdam: Meulenhoff, 1997.

References

External links
 Profile on University of Amsterdam
 Profile on NARCIS

1957 births
20th-century Dutch historians
21st-century Dutch historians
Living people
Members of the Royal Netherlands Academy of Arts and Sciences
Academic staff of the University of Amsterdam